Khadija Mosque (Swedish: Umm al-Muminin Khadija-moské) is a mosque in Malmö, Skåne County, Sweden. The mosque opened in 2017 and is the largest in Scandinavia with a capacity of 2000 people.

See also
Islam in Sweden
Religion in Sweden

References

2017 establishments in Sweden
Buildings and structures in Malmö
Mosques completed in 2017